Vinconate is a synthetic vincamine analog used as a nootropic.

References 

Nootropics
Indolonaphthyridines
Carboxylate esters
Methyl esters